Richard Forster may refer to:
 Richard Forster (physician)
 Richard Forster (photographer)

See also
 Richard Foerster (disambiguation)
 Richard Foster (disambiguation)